Henk Visser (23 March 1932 – 13 November 2015) was a long jumper from the Netherlands. He competed at the 1952 and 1960 Summer Olympics and finished seventh in 1960.

Records
On 17 September 1956, during the international competitions in Bucharest, he jumped 7.98 m, setting a national and European record. This was the longest jump in 1956 and one of the best jumps ever in Europe by that time. However, Visser could not take part at the 1956 Olympic Games due to their boycott by the Netherlands.

Besides the long jump, he also competed in the high jump and sprint, with the best achievements of 10.5 s in 100 m, 20.3 s in 200 m and 1.82 m in high jump.

Olympics
In the early 1959 Visser, who then worked as a clerk in a shipping company, left for the United States, where he obtained a study scholarship. He started at the San José College, but then moved to the Bakersfield College. At athletic competitions in Texas, he jumped 8.05 m, but overstepped the plank, and the jump was discounted. Nevetherless, he had registered 7.97 m in April 1960 in Santa Barbara, California, and was considered a candidate for a medal at the 1960 Olympics. However, he finished in seventh place with a humble result of 7.66 m.

He retired soon after the Games and later ran a sportswear and footwear export business from his home in Santa Barbara. In the 1990s he returned to the Netherlands.

References

1932 births
2015 deaths
Athletes (track and field) at the 1952 Summer Olympics
Athletes (track and field) at the 1960 Summer Olympics
Dutch male long jumpers
Olympic athletes of the Netherlands
People from Willemstad
20th-century Dutch people